Eyleifur Hafsteinsson (born 31 May 1947) is an Icelandic former footballer. He won the Icelandic championship in 1968, 1970 and 1974 and the Icelandic Cup in 1966. He was part of the Iceland national football team between 1964 and 1972, playing 26 matches and scoring 4 goals.

After coming up through the junior teams of Íþróttabandalag Akraness (ÍA), he debuted with the senior team in 1964. He became an instant hit, becoming the youngest player ever to score in the Icelandic top-tier league when he did so three days before his 17th birthday. He finished the 1964 season as the league's top goal scorer with 10 goals. The following year he spent three months in Glasgow, Scotland, where he trained with the Glasgow Rangers. He returned to ÍA before the start of the 1965 season where he scored 7 goals. In 1966, he moved to Reykjavík and joined Knattspyrnufélag Reykjavíkur where he played until 1969. In 1970, he returned to ÍA where he finished his career in 1975, at the age of 27.

Statistics

See also
List of Iceland international footballers

References

External links

Archived profile at Íþróttabandalag Akraness

1947 births
Living people
Association football forwards
Eyleifur Hafsteinsson
Eyleifur Hafsteinsson
Eyleifur Hafsteinsson
Eyleifur Hafsteinsson